Tetyana Ivanivna Baranova (26 October 1955 – 8 January 2022) was a Ukrainian lawyer. She was head of the State Archive Service of Ukraine from 2014 to 2019.

References

1955 births
2022 deaths
Ukrainian women lawyers
21st-century Ukrainian women politicians
United Centre politicians
Lawyers from Kyiv
Politicians from Kyiv